Zvika Hadar (born 7 April 1966) is an Israeli actor, comedian and television host.

Biography
Zvi (Zvika) Fruchter (later Hadar) was born in Beersheba, Israel, to Romanian Jewish family. As a child, he studied piano. Early in his career, he composed numbers for musicals.
 
Hadar first appeared on television as Jojo Khalastra on the satiric show Ha-Comedy Store. He was the host of Kokhav Nolad, the Israeli version of Idol for ten seasons. He has also acted in a number of Israeli movies including starring in Pick a Card.

In September 2012, Hadar suffered cardiac arrest upon arriving at clinic in Tel Aviv for a checkup. The cardiologist performed CPR and revived him. He was transferred taken to Ichilov Hospital and was released after cardiac catheterization.

Awards and recognition

In 1999, he was nominated for Best Actor award at the Awards of the Israeli Film Academy for his role in Afula Express.

Filmography
 
1998: Shemesh as Nachum Shemesh
1999: Kochavim Baribu'a (TV series) 
1999: Afula Express as David
2001: Shachar (TV series)
2010: Blue Natalie (TV series) as Gadi Amit
2013: Hunting Elephants as Daniel

References

External links

1966 births
Living people
Israeli entertainers
Israeli people of Romanian-Jewish descent
Actors from Beersheba
Israeli Jews
Israeli male comedians
Tel Aviv University alumni
Israeli television presenters
Mass media people from Beersheba